The 1955 Brown Bears football team was an American football team that represented Brown University as an independent during the 1955 college football season. 

In their fifth season under head coach Alva Kelley, the Bears compiled a 2–7 record, and were outscored 139 to 88. J. McGuinness was the team captain.  

This would be Brown's final year as a football independent, as the Ivy League, which Brown had helped co-found in 1954, began football competition in 1956. Six of the nine opponents on Brown's 1955 schedule were Ivy League members (with Penn the only Ivy not scheduled); for decades, (future) Ivy members had comprised about half of Brown's opponents annually.

Brown played its home games at Brown Stadium in Providence, Rhode Island.

Schedule

References

Brown
Brown Bears football seasons
Brown Bears football